is a train station in the village of Minamimaki, Minamisaku District, Nagano Prefecture, Japan, operated by East Japan Railway Company (JR East).

Lines
Saku-Hirose Station is served by the Koumi Line and is 34.9 kilometers from the terminus of the line at Kobuchizawa Station.

Station layout
The station consists of one ground-level side platform serving a single bi-directional track. There is no station building, but only a shelter directly on the platform.  The station is unattended.

History
Saku-Hirose Station opened on 16 January 1935.  With the privatization of Japanese National Railways (JNR) on 1 April 1987, the station came under the control of JR East.

Surrounding area
Chikuma River

See also
 List of railway stations in Japan

References

External links

 JR East station information 

Railway stations in Nagano Prefecture
Railway stations in Japan opened in 1935
Stations of East Japan Railway Company
Koumi Line
Minamimaki, Nagano